Wolfgang Hoppe (born 14 November 1957, Apolda, Thuringia) is a former East German decathlete, bob pilot and 36-time international medal winner who competed from the early 1980s to the late 1990s. Competing in four Winter Olympics, he won six medals with two golds (Two-man: 1984, Four-man: 1984), three silvers (Two-man: 1988, Four-man: 1988, 1992), and one bronze (1994).

At the opening ceremonies of the 1992 Winter Olympics in Albertville, Hoppe carried the flag of Germany, who was competing as a unified nation in the Winter Olympics for the first time since the 1936 Winter Olympics in Garmisch-Partenkirchen.

Hoppe also won fourteen medals at the FIBT World Championships with six golds (Two-man: 1985, 1986, 1989; Four-man: 1991, 1995, 1997), one silver (Four-man: 1987), and seven bronzes (Two-man: 1983, 1987, 1990, 1991, 1993; Four-man: 1989, 1996). He also won the Bobsleigh World Cup championship in combined men's (1991–92), two-man (1990–91), and four-man (1991–92, 1995–96).

Hoppe a former army major retired from bobsledding after the 1997 FIBT World Championships to become coach of the German national team, coaching such athletes as Susi Erdmann, Sandra Kiriasis, Gabriele Kohlisch, and André Lange.

In October 1986, he was awarded a Star of People's Friendship in gold (second class) for his sporting success. 

He is the brother of motocross racer and 37-time medal winner Heinz Hoppe.

See also

 Bobsleigh Olympic Medal table

References

 Bobsleigh two-man world championship medalists since 1931
 Bobsleigh four-man world championship medalists since 1930
 
 List of combined men's bobsleigh World Cup champions: 1985–2007
 List of four-man bobsleigh World Cup champions since 1985
 List of two-man bobsleigh World Cup champions since 1985

External links
 
 

1957 births
Living people
People from Apolda
German decathletes
German male bobsledders
Bobsledders at the 1984 Winter Olympics
Bobsledders at the 1988 Winter Olympics
Bobsledders at the 1992 Winter Olympics
Bobsledders at the 1994 Winter Olympics
Olympic bobsledders of East Germany
Olympic bobsledders of Germany
Olympic gold medalists for East Germany
Olympic silver medalists for East Germany
Olympic silver medalists for Germany
Olympic bronze medalists for Germany
Olympic medalists in bobsleigh
National People's Army military athletes
Medalists at the 1984 Winter Olympics
Sportspeople from Thuringia
Medalists at the 1988 Winter Olympics
Medalists at the 1992 Winter Olympics
Medalists at the 1994 Winter Olympics
People of the Stasi